The 2008 Australia rugby union tour was a series of seven matches played by the Australia national rugby union team in November–December 2008.
The tour was preceded by a match against All Blacks for the Bledisloe Cup and closed with a match against Barbarian FC

The Matches

Matches

Bledisloe Cup match
A first match was played in Hong Kong against New Zealand. It was the fourth match between the two teams. Winning the match, the All Blacks tied the series (2–2) and retained the Bledisloe Cup.

In Italy 

Against Italy, the Wallabies suffer the strong play of Italian forwards and the strong defence of "azzurri", winning the match also in the last 20 minutes, thanks a try from Quade Cooper.

Against England 
England offered a strong opposition in the first half, especially between the 35th and 39th minutes, and scored a try with Nick Easter and a penalty with Danny Cipriani, but the Aussies were always ahead thanks to the kicks of Giteau and Martlock, until a try of Adam Ashley-Cooper closed the match.

Against France 
As in the two previous matches, Wallabies obtain victory thanks a better second half. The try of Peter Hynes and a kick after France reached the 13–13 in the beginning of second Half. On French Sie, Skrela missed five kicks.

Against Wales

Final match with Barbarians 
Australia was approached by the British Olympic Association to play the Barbarians at Wembley Stadium on 3 December 2008. The match formed part of the BOA's programme of events to celebrate the centenary of the first London Olympic Games where Australia defeated a Great Britain (Cornwall) side in the final 32 – 3. In 1908 France were the defending Olympic champions, but when they withdrew from the event, leaving just Australia and Great Britain to contest the gold medal, it was then County champions Cornwall who took to the field to represent the host nation. Cornwall had already been defeated in Australia's earlier 31-match tour. Cornwall's 1908 contribution was also further recognised by the presentation of the Cornwall Cup to the winning captain at Wembley, with the players of the respective sides receiving gold or silver commemorative medals. The game was the first rugby union fixture to take place in the new Wembley Stadium, the old stadium having been last used for Wales' last gasp 32–31 victory over England in the then Five Nations in 1999.

See also
 2008 end-of-year rugby union tests

2008 rugby union tours
2008
2008
2008
2008
2008
2008
2008–09 in European rugby union
2008 in Australian rugby union
2008–09 in Irish rugby union
2008–09 in English rugby union
2008–09 in Welsh rugby union
2008–09 in Scottish rugby union
2008–09 in French rugby union
2008–09 in Italian rugby union